The Abrau Peninsula is a north-western spur of the Greater Caucasus Mountain Range, located on the Black Sea between Novorossiysk and Anapa, in the Krasnodar Region of Russia. It contains the Utrish State Nature Reserve.

Climate and ecology
The Abrau Peninsula is the only place in Russia that harbours a Mediterranean vegetation. The climate of the Abrau Peninsula is sub-Mediterranean with cool rainy winters without a stable snow cover and with hot dry summers. The mean annual precipitation is 500 mm, the mean July and February temperatures are 23.7°C and 2.7°C, respectively.  The area vegetation consists of three major belts: (1) coastal slopes with sub-Mediterranean xerophytic forests and shrublands with pistachio (Pistacia mutica), juniper (Juniperus excelsa, J. oxycedrus, J. foetidissima), oak (Quercus pubescens) and oriental hornbeam (Carpinus orientalis); (2) piedmont and low-mountain area with a combination of mesophitic and xerophytic forests and a predominance of two oak species (Q. pubescens, Q. petraea), oriental hornbeam and junipers; (3) low mountains with mesophitic deciduous forests with a domination of oak (Q. petraea), hornbeam (Carpinus caucasica), lime (Tilia begoniifolia), maple (Acer laetum), ash (Fraxinus excelsior) and beech (Fagus orientalis).

References

  This article incorporates text from a publication under the terms of the Creative Commons Attribution License (CC BY 4.0), which permits unrestricted use, distribution, and reproduction in any medium, provided the original author and source are credited. The source of the text is: Korobushkin, Daniil; Irina Semenyuk, & Ivan Tuf (2016). "An annotated checklist of the Chilopoda and Diplopoda (Myriapoda) of the Abrau Peninsula, northwestern Caucasus, Russia". Biodiversity Data Journal 4: e7308. 

Landforms of Krasnodar Krai
Peninsulas of Russia